Macromphalus magnificus is a species of sea snail, a marine gastropod mollusk in the family Vanikoridae.

Original description
   Poppe G.T. & Tagaro S. (2016). New marine mollusks from the central Philippines in the families Aclididae, Chilodontidae, Cuspidariidae, Nuculanidae, Nystiellidae, Seraphsidae and Vanikoridae. Visaya. 4(5): 83-103. page(s): 93.

References

External links
 Worms Link

Vanikoridae